Ocnerioxyna is a genus of tephritid  or fruit flies in the family Tephritidae.

Species
Ocnerioxyna gracilis (Loew, 1861)
Ocnerioxyna hemilea (Séguy, 1939)
Ocnerioxyna maripilosa (Munro, 1947)

References

Tephritinae
Tephritidae genera
Diptera of Africa